My First Planet is a British radio sitcom written by Phil Whelans.  Set on a newly founded space colony, second-in-command Brian Palmer (Nicholas Lyndhurst) finds himself unexpectedly in charge when their intended leader dies and must work with the colonists to ensure their survival.

The series is produced by David Tyler for Pozzitive Television and broadcast on BBC Radio 4 Extra. The first series initially aired in 2012 and the second in 2014.

Cast

 Brian - Nicholas Lyndhurst
 Lillian - Vicki Pepperdine
 Mason - Tom Goodman-Hill
 Archer - Phil Whelans
 Carol - Cariad Lloyd (series 1), Letty Butler (series 2)
 Richard - John Dorney

Series one

Series two

Reception

The first series received coverage as 'Pick of the Day' in The Times, The Daily Telegraph and The Independent, with The Daily Telegraphs Gillian Reynolds commenting: "What makes it funny is that its characters are (and remain) all too recognisably human".

References 

BBC Radio comedy programmes
2012 radio programme debuts